The 2021–22 Indian Super League playoffs was the eighth playoffs series of the Indian Super League, one of the top Indian professional football leagues. The playoffs began on 11 March 2022 and concluded with the final on 20 March in Goa.

The top four teams from the 2021–22 ISL regular season had qualified for the playoffs. The semi-finals took place over two legs while the final was a one-off match at the Fatorda Stadium in Margao, Goa.

Season table

Teams 
 Jamshedpur
 ATK Mohun Bagan
 Hyderabad
 Kerala Blasters

Bracket

Semi-finals

Semi-finals 

 Kerala Blasters won 2–1 on aggregate. 

 Hyderabad won 3–2 on aggregate.

Final

References

2021–22 Indian Super League season